Abdelatif Saadoune (born 1 January 1976) is a Moroccan former racing cyclist. He rode at the 2014 UCI Road World Championships.

Major results

2001
 2nd Overall Tour du Faso
2002
 1st Overall Tour du Faso
1st Stage 1
2003
 1st Stage 9 Tour d'Algérie
 2nd Overall Tour du Sénégal
2004
 4th Overall Tour du Maroc
2006
 1st  Road race, National Road Championships
 Tour du Faso
1st Stages 2 & 10
 5th Overall Tour du Maroc
2007
 2nd Road race, National Road Championships
 2nd Overall Tour du Sénégal
 5th Overall Tour du Faso
 8th Overall Tour du Maroc
2009
 1st Overall Tour du Faso
 1st Overall Tour des Aéroports
 2nd Road race, National Road Championships
 2nd Overall Tour of Rwanda
1st Stages 4 & 6
 African Road Championships
5th Road race
5th Time trial
 8th Overall Tour of Eritrea
2010
 1st 2009–10 UCI Africa Tour
 Les Challenges de la Marche Verte
1st GP Oued Eddahab
2nd Grand Prix Al Massira
8th GP Sakia El Hamra
 1st Stage 5 Tour des Aéroports
 National Road Championships
2nd Road race
2nd Time trial
 Challenge du Prince
3rd Trophée de la Maison Royale
7th Trophée de l'Anniversaire
 4th Overall Tour du Mali
1st Prologue & Stage 5
 10th Road race, African Road Championships
2011
 1st  Team time trial, Pan Arab Games (with Mouhssine Lahsaini, Ismaïl Ayoune and Adil Jelloul)
 National Road Championships
2nd Time trial
3rd Road race
 3rd  Team time trial, African Road Championships
2012
 Challenge du Prince
1st Trophée de la Maison Royale
6th Trophée Princier
8th Trophée de l'Anniversaire
 Les Challenges de la Marche Verte
2nd Grand Prix Sakia El Hamra
8th Grand Prix Al Massira
 National Road Championships
2nd Road race
3rd Time trial
 Challenge des phosphates
6th Challenge Ben Guerir
7th Challenge Youssoufia
 7th Overall Tour du Maroc
2013
 1st  Road race, National Road Championships
 3rd Trophée Princier, Challenge du Prince
2014
 Challenge du Prince
1st Trophée Princier
5th Trophée de la Maison Royale
10th Trophée de l'Anniversaire
 Les Challenges de la Marche Verte
2nd GP Oued Eddahab
5th Grand Prix Sakia El Hamra
7th Grand Prix Al Massira
2015
 Les Challenges de la Marche Verte
1st Grand Prix Al Massira
3rd Grand Prix Sakia El Hamra
7th GP Oued Eddahab
 Challenge des phosphates
1st Grand Prix de Youssoufia
5th Grand Prix de Khouribga
 Challenge du Prince
3rd Trophée de la Maison Royale
4th Trophée de l'Anniversaire
7th Trophée Princier
 4th Overall Tour de Côte d'Ivoire
 7th Circuit d'Alger
 8th Overall Tour du Faso
 8th UAE Cup
2016
 Challenge du Prince
6th Trophée de la Maison Royale
7th Trophée de l'Anniversaire
 7th Overall Tour du Cameroun
1st Stage 2

References

External links

1976 births
Living people
Moroccan male cyclists
Place of birth missing (living people)